There are 34 routes assigned to the "S" zone of the California Route Marker Program, which designates county routes in California. The "S" zone includes county highways in Imperial, Orange, Riverside, San Diego, and Santa Barbara counties.

S1

It begins at State Route 94 near Barrett and moves northward across Interstate 8, just west of the Laguna Summit. This segment is also known as Buckman Springs Road. North of I-8, it is the Sunrise Scenic Byway, a National Forest Scenic Byway.

Route description

The route begins at SR 94 near Barrett not far from the Mexican border. From there, it heads northward along Buckman Springs Road. Soon afterwards, it enters the Cleveland National Forest. When the road reaches Interstate 8, while Buckman Springs Road continues northeastward across the freeway, CR S1 continues in a northwest direction along Old Highway 80, the original alignment of U.S. Route 80 in California. It then closely parallels I-8 for several miles. Upon crossing the freeway at Laguna Junction, CR S1 separates from Old Highway 80 and becomes Sunrise Scenic Byway.

From Interstate 8, it begins its ascent into the Laguna Mountains. The route here was built along a cliff overlooking Pine Valley to its west. Around here, the vegetation still consists of chaparral and sagebrush. As the route gains elevation through Cleveland National Forest, the route becomes more heavily forested. Around here, numerous campgrounds dot the side of the road. There is a picnic area overlooking Anza-Borrego Desert State Park near the Burnt Rancheria Campground, which is often said to deeply contrast the forest scenery along the route. Upon passing the settlement of Mount Laguna, the vegetation along the route mostly consists of dead trees devastated by the 2003 Cedar Fire.

As the route approaches its north end at State Route 79, Lake Cuyamaca is visible. The north terminus is located just north of Cuyamaca Rancho State Park where it meets SR 79.

History

The route was established by the county in the year 1959, where the entire route was designated as it is now. No major numbering or routing changes occurred throughout its history. The northern segment of the route was also established as a Scenic Byway in 1959.

Major intersections

S2

County Route S2 (CR S2) is a county highway in the U.S. state of California. CR S2 is the third longest county route in California and is almost exclusively a two-lane rural road. It largely follows the route of the former Southern Emigrant Trail and Butterfield Overland Mail.

Route description

Starting at mile marker zero, the highway begins at a junction with State Route 79 near the community of Warner Springs. As it descends southeast toward the desert floor it becomes San Felipe Road until it crosses State Route 78 at Scissors Crossing in Shelter Valley (formerly called Earthquake Valley). South of SR 78, the name of the highway changes to the Great Southern Overland Stage Route of 1849, then further south, it forks at a remote junction with the historic dirt road to become to Sweeney Pass Road. East of the San Diego/Imperial County Line of this segment is also called Imperial Highway. The highway runs south through an interchange with Interstate 8 then ends at a junction with State Route 98 near Ocotillo.

Major intersections

S3

County Route S3 (CR S3) is a county highway in San Diego County, California, United States. It begins at a junction with State Route 78 and runs roughly north over Yaqui Pass to Borrego Springs, bearing the name Yaqui Pass Road. It turns left onto Deep Well Trail and left again onto Borrego Springs Road. It ends at a junction with County Route S22 at a large roundabout known as Christmas Circle.

There is one call box on this highway, located at Yaqui Pass summit.

The highway is part of the Juan Bautista de Anza National Historic Trail Auto Tour Route.

Major intersections

S4

County Route S4 (CR S4) is a road in San Diego County, California, United States, in the northern city limits of San Diego and in the city of Poway. United States. The route is traversed entirely by Poway Road from Interstate 15 east to State Route 67.

The route's western terminus is at I-15, where the road continues west as Rancho Penasquitos Boulevard, traverses across SR 56, and finally ends as Carmel Mountain Road. Eastward, the road traverses through the city of Poway as Poway Road and has its east end at SR 67. Within Poway, it is one of the busiest streets in the city.

The route was established in 1959.

Major intersections

S5

County Route S5 (CR S5) is a road in San Diego County, California, United States, in Poway and San Diego. It runs from its southern end at Poway Road (County Route S4) in Poway to its northern end at Interstate 15 in San Diego.

Route description
The road's south end is at Poway Road (CR S4) in Poway. It winds north through Poway as Espola Road and then turns slightly west, ending at Interstate 15 as Rancho Bernardo Road (which continues past I-15).

The route was established in 1959.

Major intersections

S6

County Route S6 (CR S6) is a county highway in San Diego County, California, United States. It connects Del Mar with Palomar Mountain across San Diego County. It is one of a few San Diego county routes with a discontinuity in its routing.

Route description
CR S6 starts at CR S21 in Del Mar as Via de la Valle.  It crosses Interstate 5 and meets with CR S8 in Rancho Santa Fe at the intersection of Via de la Valle and Paseo Delicias.  At El Camino Del Norte, the name changes to Del Dios Highway, past the community of Del Dios and into Escondido.

In Escondido, CR S6 runs along West and East Valley Parkways, to Valley Center Road through Valley Center. CR S6 ends at State Route 76.

It intersects with CR S7, then continues north until it ends at the Palomar Observatory.

The route was defined in 1959.

Major intersections

S7

County Route S7 (CR S7) is a county highway in San Diego County, California, United States, that provides access to Palomar Mountain.

Route description
CR S7's western terminus is at State Route 76 east of Pauma Valley, California. It begins as a dirt road known as the Nate Harrison Grade. Then it returns to pavement as it ascends Palomar Mountain and meets San Diego County Route S6. It enters Palomar Mountain State Park. Then, it descends to end at SR 76 near Lake Henshaw.

Nate Harrison Grade is not signed as County Route S7, but it is a logical westward extension of the signed portion.  With a 10% grade, it was the only road to the top of Palomar Mountain until the 1940s, when East Grade Road ("Highway to the Stars") was built for the construction of the Palomar Observatory.  The road was formerly known as "Nigger Nate Road", named after Nate Harrison, an early African-American homesteader.  The name was changed in 1956 at the request of the NAACP.

On a small turnout is a monument to Gregory Pacheco and a good view to the north. According to a plaque at the monument, pictured below, Gregory Pacheco was a firefighter who died in the La Jolla Fire in 1999. The descent on the eastern side of Palomar Mountain offers panoramic views of Lake Henshaw.

Major intersections

S8

County Route S8 (CR S8) is a county highway, mostly along Lomas Santa Fe Drive and Linea Del Cielo, in San Diego County, California, United States. Its western end is CR S21 (locally signed as "Highway 101") in Solana Beach and its eastern end is at Via De La Valle in Rancho Santa Fe.

Route description
The route begins in Solana Beach at Old Highway 101. It winds eastward through San Diego County, crossing through Solana Beach and unincorporated San Diego County, and ends at Via De La Valle (CR S6) in Rancho Santa Fe. The last portion of the county road passes through Rancho Santa Fe on Paseo Delicias.

Major intersections

S9

County Route S9 (CR S9), mostly known as Encinitas Boulevard, is a road in San Diego County, California, United States. Its west end is at CR S21 (Coast Highway 101) in Encinitas and its east end is at Paseo Delicias (CR S6) in Rancho Santa Fe.

Once outside Encinitas, the county route follows portions of Rancho Santa Fe Road, La Bajada, Los Morros, and La Granada, before terminating at Paseo Delicias.

Major intersections

S10

County Route S10 (CR S10), known entirely as Rancho Santa Fe Road, is a road in San Diego County, California, United States, that runs through the North County region of San Diego County.

Route description
CR S10 begins at Encinitas Boulevard in Encinitas, heading in a generally northward direction. It enters Carlsbad and turns eastward. This road travels into San Marcos and passes near the unincorporated area of Lake San Marcos. (The entire run of the road past Carlsbad is located in parts of the incorporated city of San Marcos; often, at this point, the incorporated portions only follow the road, leaving unincorporated islands nearby). Rancho Santa Fe Road intersects with San Marcos Boulevard and continues northward. There is a junction with State Route 78. A short distance north, Rancho Santa Fe ends at County Route S14 (which changes names from Santa Fe Avenue to Mission Road at the intersection).

Major intersections

S11

County Route S11 (CR S11), known entirely as El Camino Real, is a county route in San Diego County, California, United States. It runs through the North County region in San Diego County, from Encinitas Boulevard (County Route S9) in Encinitas to State Route 78 in Oceanside. As its street name implies, it is part of the 600-mile (965-kilometer) commemorative route connecting the 21 Spanish missions in California (formerly Alta California).

Route description
CR S11's southern terminus is Encinitas Boulevard (CR S9) in Encinitas. It continues northward through Encinitas, intersecting with Lecuadia Boulevard/Olivenhain Road, which leads to CR S10 (Rancho Santa Fe Road) east of this intersection. After this point, it enters Carlsbad, where it intersects with Palomar Airport Road (CR S12). It continues northward through Carlsbad, ending at State Route 78 in Oceanside.

Note that El Camino Real continues for several miles beyond both termini. It extends southward through Encinitas until it reaches San Elijo Lagoon and ends at Manchester Avenue. An unconnected road further east also called El Camino Real starts at the San Elijo Lagoon and continues south for several miles until Carmel Mountain Road. Northward in Oceanside, El Camino Real passes under State Route 76 and ends just north at Douglas Drive.

Major intersections

S12

County Route S12 (CR S12), also known as Palomar Airport Road, San Marcos Boulevard, Twin Oaks Valley Road, and Deer Springs Road, is a county highway in San Diego County, California, United States. It runs through the North County region of San Diego County from Carlsbad Boulevard (County Route S21) in Carlsbad to Interstate 15 near Hidden Meadows.

Route description
CR S12's western terminus is at Carlsbad Boulevard (CR S21) in Carlsbad. Almost immediately after it begins, CR S12 (this portion of which is called Palomar Airport Road) intersects with Interstate 5. It passes Legoland California and continues eastward, passing its namesake, McClellan–Palomar Airport. It intersects with El Camino Real (CR S11) before running through a number of industrial and business parks. Eventually, CR S12 enters San Marcos, where it becomes San Marcos Boulevard after an intersection with Business Park Drive. San Marcos Boulevard intersects Rancho Santa Fe Road (CR S10) and continues eastward, crossing State Route 78. Shortly thereafter, San Marcos Boulevard intersects with Twin Oaks Valley Road, which assumes the S12 designation after this junction. Shortly after becoming CR S12, Twin Oaks Valley Road passes over Mission Road (CR S14) without actually intersecting it, then continues to the northern city limits of San Marcos. At the edge of the city, Twin Oaks Valley Road narrows into a private road, and CR S12 bears right to become Deer Springs Road, which continues northward through unincorporated land. Eventually the road turns east, and CR S12 ends at an interchange with Interstate 15, though the road itself continues as Mountain Meadow Road through Hidden Meadows.

The route was established in 1961.

Major intersections

S13

County Route S13 (CR S13), also known as Vista Village Drive, East Vista Way, and Mission Road, is a county highway in San Diego County, California, United States, that runs through the North County region of San Diego County. It is distinctive for having a three-mile (5 km) discontinuity in Bonsall.

Route description
CR S13's southern terminus is at State Route 78 in Vista, where the street is known as Vista Village Drive. This section of CR S13 is the northern boundary of the newly renovated downtown area of Vista, and in this area the road intersects with Santa Fe Avenue, which is CR S14. Shortly afterwards, the road's name changes to East Vista Way, and continues northward outside the city limits into the unincorporated community of Bonsall.

CR S13 is unusual in that, according to official legislation, its route is discontinuous. In Bonsall, East Vista Way meets State Route 76 and, from this point, loses its status as CR S13. Nearly three miles northeast on SR 76, CR S13 begins again, continuing northward, but as South Mission Road.

Mission Road cuts north through Bonsall and passes the neighborhoods of San Luis Rey Heights and Winterwarm before entering Fallbrook. In Fallbrook, South Mission Road splits off into South Main Avenue, which carries the S13 signage. These two streets run parallel to each other for several blocks; East Fallbrook Road (SR S15) begins at Mission and intersects Main. After a short distance, Mission turns east, intersecting Main; Mission then continues as S13. CR S13 continues eastward, ending at an interchange with Interstate 15.

Almost all of S13, except for later realigned portions, is an old alignment of U.S. Route 395, and Historic Route signs are posted in unincorporated areas.

The route was established in 1968.

Major intersections

S14

County Route S14 (CR S14), also known as Santa Fe Avenue, Mission Road, and Mission Avenue, is a county highway in San Diego County, California, United States, that runs through the North County region of San Diego County. It runs from State Route 76 in Oceanside to Centre City Parkway in Escondido.

Route description
CR S14's western terminus is at State Route 76 in Oceanside, where it is known as North Santa Fe Avenue. It travels into Vista, becoming South Santa Fe Avenue before intersecting with County Route S13, or Vista Village Drive, in downtown Vista. At this point it begins to run parallel to State Route 78, which it does until its terminus. Santa Fe travels into western San Marcos, where it intersects with County Route S10 (Rancho Santa Fe Road); it is at this intersection that Santa Fe becomes Mission Road. Mission continues through San Marcos, passing under Twin Oaks Valley Road (County Route S12) without an intersection. In eastern San Marcos, Mission Road crosses State Route 78 without an interchange and becomes Mission Avenue. Shortly afterward, it enters Escondido, where it crosses Interstate 15, again with no interchange. Shortly after this point, the freeway portion of SR 78 ends and that route turns right onto Broadway, but CR S14's eastern terminus is at Centre City Parkway, a few blocks short from Broadway.

CR S14 east of CR S13, except for later realigned portions, is an old alignment of U.S. Route 395, and Historic Route signs are posted in unincorporated areas.

The route was established in 1968.

Major intersections

S15

County Route S15 (CR S15) is a county highway in San Diego County, California, United States. It runs from County Route S13 (Mission Road) in Fallbrook to Old Highway 395.

Route description
CR S15's western terminus is at CR S13, also known as Mission Road, in Fallbrook. It begins as East Fallbrook Street. At the intersection with South Stage Coach Lane, CR S15 continues south to the intersection with Reche Road, at which point CR S15 again heads east. CR S15 continues east as Reche Road until it reaches its eastern terminus at the intersection with Old Highway 395, adjacent to Interstate 15.

The route was established in 1959.

Major intersections

S16

County Route S16 (CR S16), also known as Pala-Temecula Road, Pala Road, and Pechanga Parkway, is a county highway in San Diego and Riverside counties in California, United States. It runs from its south end at State Route 76 on the Pala Indian Reservation to its north end at State Route 79 (Temecula Parkway) in Temecula.

Route description
The route's southern terminus is at SR 76 on the Pala Indian Reservation, in the San Luis Rey River Valley, near the community of Pala. It twists through a short but rugged and steep mountain range and continues northward as Pala-Temecula Road through rural San Diego County.

When it crosses the Riverside County line and enters the Pechanga Indian Reservation, it becomes Pala Road. Shortly thereafter, County Route S16 widens to four lanes as it reaches the city limits of Temecula, where it becomes Pechanga Parkway. Near the Pechanga Resort & Casino, Pechanga Parkway becomes a six-lane arterial road and continues along several large suburban neighborhoods before ending at a T intersection with SR 79 (Temecula Parkway). The portion of County Route S16 known as Pechanga Parkway, as well as the portion of SR 79 known as Temecula Parkway, are unsigned because the City of Temecula maintains jurisdiction over both segments.

The route was established in 1959.

Major intersections

S17

County Route S17 (CR S17) is a county highway in San Diego County, California, United States. It runs from Interstate 5 in Chula Vista to Interstate 8 in El Cajon. The route consists of portions of several roads passing through the cities of Chula Vista and El Cajon, and the unincorporated communities of Bonita, Spring Valley, and Rancho San Diego.

County Route S17 roughly parallels State Route 54 from Interstate 5 east to State Route 125, running along E Street, Bonita Road, Sweetwater Road, South Worthington Street, and Paradise Valley Road. The route then shares the same alignment as State Route 54, from State Route 125 northeast to the El Cajon city limit, running along Jamacha Boulevard, Campo Road, and Jamacha Road. Within El Cajon, CR S17 shares the same alignment as the former State Route 54, continuing north to Interstate 8 along Jamacha Road and 2nd Street.

The portions of County Route S17 within the cities of Chula Vista and El Cajon are no longer signed. The portions of the route within Bonita and Spring Valley are signed. However, all signs in Rancho San Diego (along Campo and Jamacha Roads) appear to have been removed except for the one heading east coming from the terminus of the freeway portion of State Route 94.  In El Cajon city limits, the route is signed with Business Route 54.

The route was established in 1964.

Major intersections

S18

County Route S18 (CR S18) is a county highway in Orange County, California, United States. The route follows El Toro Road and Santiago Canyon Road which proceeds in a boomerang-like pattern from State Route 133 in Laguna Beach to State Route 55 near Orange. CR S18 traverses as a loop around the urban areas of Orange County and cuts through the Santa Ana Mountains. The road is one of four county routes in Orange County that are signed in areas nearby the route, such as southbound Interstate 5 and southbound State Route 133. It is also noted to be the longest county route in Orange County and is the only major route that allows motorists to drive through, in, and out of the Santa Ana Mountains.

The Santiago Canyon Road portion of CR S18 in the Santa Ana Mountains is planned to become designated as an official scenic highway as part of the State Scenic Highway System. This makes it the second highway to become designated as a scenic road in Orange County, California, despite the impact from the Santiago Fire as part of the wildfires in October 2007.

Major intersections

The entire route is in Orange County.

S19

County Route S19 (CR S19) is a county highway in the U.S. state of California in Orange County. The route follows Live Oak Canyon Road from O'Neill Park to El Toro Road (S18) to Trabuco Canyon.

County Route S19 is notorious for many fatal accidents that have occurred in the recent years since 2000, and many lost lives due to such accidents.

The route was established in 1961.

Major intersections

S20

County Route S20 (CR S20) was a county highway in the U.S. state of California. As the only county route in Santa Barbara County at the time, it was merged with State Route 1 in 1988, rerouting SR 1 from Harris Grade Road to the former county route leading into Vandenberg Air Force Base.

S21

County Route S21 (CR S21) is a south–north running road serving the coastal communities of northern San Diego County, California, United States, running from San Diego in the south to Oceanside in the north. The route is signed in many places as "Historic Route 101" with the official Historic U.S. 101 shields. CR S21 follows the prior alignment of U.S. Route 101 through this region. The route is also called "Coast Highway" in some places as well.

Route description
County Route S21 begins at Interstate 5 in the north of San Diego as Genesee Avenue. After proceeding west-northwest for 3/4 mile (1.2 km) it intersects Torrey Pines Road and continues north with that name, providing access to the Torrey Pines State Natural Reserve. The road then travels north into Del Mar, where it is renamed "Camino Del Mar". While in Del Mar the route passes both the historic Del Mar Racetrack and through the historic downtown of Del Mar. In Solana Beach the route moves closer to the coast. Along this stretch, it is named "Highway 101" and the city has signed the route along its length with faux U.S. Highway shields that resemble the official U.S. 101 shields in use today along with the state issued Historic 101 shield. While to the north in Encinitas the route's name becomes "Coast Highway 101" also in homage to the old U.S. Route. In Carlsbad it becomes "Carlsbad Boulevard”. The route is named "Coast Highway" in Oceanside, and comes to an end at Interstate 5 just south of Camp Pendleton.

The section of this road between La Costa Avenue and Palomar Airport Road was once known as the Oceanside-Carlsbad Freeway. The majority of the route from the Del Mar city limits to State Route 76 in Oceanside is signed as Historic U.S. 101, and is also an unsigned Business Route Interstate 5.

Major intersections

S22

County Route S22 (CR S22) is a county highway in San Diego and Imperial counties in California, United States. It runs from San Felipe Road (County Route S2) west of Ranchita to State Route 86 in Salton City. The route is known as Montezuma Valley Road, Palm Canyon Drive, Christmas Circle, Peg Leg Road, and Borrego Salton Sea Way.

Route description
The route begins at a junction with County Route S2 (San Felipe Road) in San Diego County and runs eastward as Montezuma Valley Road through the rural community of Ranchita.

As it enters Borrego Springs, the highway turns right onto Palm Canyon Drive. In the middle of Borrego Springs, it passes through Christmas Circle, the only large traffic circle in San Diego County.

It continues east, turns north onto Peg Leg Road, and turns east again onto Borrego Salton Sea Way. CR S22 enters Imperial County, runs through Anza-Borrego Desert State Park again and ends at a junction with State Route 86 in Salton City, a community on the shore of the Salton Sea.

The route was established in 1968.

Major intersections

S24

County Route S24 (CR S24) is a county highway in southeast Imperial County, California, United States. It is north of, across the Colorado River and adjacent to Yuma, Arizona, serving the community of Winterhaven. The southern two-thirds of the route travels through the Quechan Indian Tribal lands of the Fort Yuma Indian Reservation. 

Route description

The route begins from Winterhaven, adjacent to the eastern exit of Interstate 8 at Winterhaven. Of note, the osprey have snag perches along the river route, and can be seen eating fish on pole tops, towers, etc.

The terminus at the Laguna Dam turn-off transitions into the extension westwards in southwest Arizona from U.S. 95 in Arizona, westwards on Imperial Dam Road of Yuma County, Arizona and the US Army Yuma Proving Ground.

No traffic lights occur on the route. Only one stop sign is encountered while traveling north to south; that one 4-way stop is encountered at about 1.7 miles north of Winterhaven.  south of the Imperial Dam entrance, the Ferguson Lake Road and the Senator Wash access exits to the northwest. The eastern access points to the Little Picacho Wilderness can be found along the northern sections of Ferguson Lake Road (a sometimes rugged, wash-boarded dirt road).

The route was established in 1970.

CR S24 serves as a second access route to the Yuma Proving Ground, and also to the main housing and administration center of YPG. The route is also the main access to the housing facilities in the Imperial Dam region, administered by the Bureau of Land Management; the Imperial Dam housing region is on the Arizona side of the Colorado River.

Major intersections

S25

County Route S25 (CR S25), commonly known as Chapman Avenue, is a 4.5 mile stretch of road in Orange, California, United States, that primarily travels east-west. The western terminus of the route is at an interchange with State Route 55, which leads to the remainder of Chapman Avenue, a street that bisects Old Towne Orange and travels all the way to the Anaheim Resort district. The eastern terminus is in the more rural Orange Park Acres neighborhood near Santiago Canyon College and connects to County Route S18, known as Santiago Canyon Road.

CR S25 was formerly a part of LRN 182, a route designated in 1933.

Major intersections

S26

County Route S26 (CR S26) is a county highway in Imperial County, California, United States. It runs from State Route 78 / State Route 86 in Westmorland to State Route 115 northeast of Brawley. Portions of the route are known as Borats Road, Kalin Road and Rutherford Road.

Major intersections

S27

County Route S27 (CR S27) is a county highway in Imperial County, California, United States. It runs from Forrester Road (CR S30) to Highline Road (CR S33). Most of the route is known as Keystone Road, with a small portion of McConnell Road connecting the two segments of Keystone Road.

Major intersections

S28

County Route S28 (CR S28) is a county highway in Imperial County, California, United States. It runs from Forrester Road (CR S30) to Holt Road (CR S32). Most of the route is known as Worthington Road, while the portion within the city of Imperial is known as Barioni Boulevard.

Major intersections

S29

County Route S29 (CR S29), known entirely as Drew Road, is a county highway in Imperial County, California, United States. It runs from State Route 98 west of Mount Signal and north of the U.S.-Mexico border to Evan Hewes Highway (CR S80) in Seeley.

Major intersections

S30

County Route S30 (CR S30) is a county highway in Imperial County, California, United States. It runs from State Route 98 in Mount Signal, north of the U.S.-Mexico border, to Sorenson Avenue (State Route 111) in Calipatria. The route is known as Brockman Road, McCabe Road, Forrester Road, Center Street in Westmorland, Walker Road, Gentry Road, Eddins Road, and Main Street in Calipatria.

Major intersections

S31

County Route S31 (CR S31) is a county highway in Imperial County, California, United States. It runs from State Route 98 near Calexico, north of the U.S.-Mexico border, to Main Street (former State Route 78) in Brawley. Most of the route is known as Dogwood Road (although it is sometimes signed as Dogwood Avenue in El Centro). In Brawley, it is known as Imperial Avenue and Plaza Street.

Major intersections

S32

County Route S32 (CR S32) is a county highway in Imperial County, California, United States. It runs from Interstate 8 and State Route 7 south of Holtville to State Route 78 east of Brawley. The route is known as Orchard Road, Holt Road, and small segments of Gonder Road and Butters Road. In Holtville, it is known as Cedar Avenue and Holt Avenue.

Major intersections

S33

County Route S33 (CR S33) is a county highway in Imperial County, California, United States. It runs from State Route 98 east of Bonds Corner, north of the U.S.-Mexico border, to State Route 78 east of Brawley. The route is known as Bonesteele Road, Kumberg Road, Miller Road, Kavanaugh Road, Highline Road, Gonder Road, and Green Road.

Major intersections

S34

County Route S34 (CR S34), known entirely as Ogilby Road, is a county highway in Imperial County, California, United States. It runs from Interstate 8 near Felicity and west of Yuma, Arizona to the State Route 78 portion between Blythe and Brawley. Located in the Yuma Desert and close to the Algodones Dunes, the road also goes through the ghost town of Ogilby.

Major intersections

S78

County Route S78 (CR S78) was a county highway in Imperial County, California, United States. It is the former routing of the present-day State Route 78 portion between the south junction of State Route 115 and the small community of Palo Verde.

S80

County Route S80 (CR S80) is a county highway in Imperial County, California, United States. It was once a portion of U.S. Route 80, which no longer enters the state. Most of the route is known as Evan Hewes Highway, while the portion of the route within El Centro is known as Adams Avenue, 4th Street, and Main Street.

Route description

CR S80 begins in the west at the junction of CR S2 (Imperial Highway) as the Evan Hewes Highway roughly paralleling the routing of Interstate 8.

In downtown El Centro, CR S80 becomes Adams Avenue. At Imperial Avenue, CR S80 junctions with State Route 86 from the north and Business Loop I-8 from the south. The roads run concurrent down Adams Avenue, and all three turn south along 4th Street. CR S80 then turns to the east along Main Street which takes it out of El Centro while SR 86 and Business I-8 continue south. Outside of El Centro after its junction with CR S31 (Dogwood Road), CR S80 resumes the designation of Evan Hewes Highway. CR S80 also intersects State Route 111 along this stretch. S80 continues east until it reaches its terminus at the junction with State Route 115. State Route 115 continues along the Evan Hewes Highway and old U.S. Route 80.

History
U.S. Route 80 was deleted from California legislatively in 1964, though it would be another ten years before all the U.S. Highway signage was removed from the route. CR S80 was defined in 1973 shortly before the last Route 80 signs had been taken down.

In 2006, the California legislature, as part of concurrent resolution ACR 123, made the former Route 80, including County Route S80, an official historic route.

For the short distance CR S80 runs concurrent with SR 86, it is part of the Juan Bautista de Anza National Historic Trail. This trail runs along the route Juan Bautista de Anza took along his expedition into California from 1775–76.

Major intersections

See also

References

S*